Elections to the Wigan Council were held on Thursday, 6 May 1982, with one third of the council up for election. The newly formed Alliance made three gains, replacing the Conservatives as the main opposition to Labour. The Alliance massively increased upon the Liberals' past participation, contesting every ward, in marked contrast to a year in which candidate variety fell to a low, with only the former Labour councillor, standing again as Independent Labour in Hindley ward, not representing the three aforementioned choices. Overall turnout was down 2.6% to 33.6%.

Election result

This result had the following consequences for the total number of seats on the Council after the elections:

Ward results

References

1982 English local elections
1982
1980s in Greater Manchester
May 1982 events in the United Kingdom